Japan Shotokan Karate Association (JSKA) was founded by Keigo Abe in 1999. Abe was a former instructor graduate of the Japan Karate Association and trained and taught at the JKA Headquarters for nearly 35 years. He held a number of senior positions within the JKA and latterly the Matsuno section of the JKA. He had been a senior student of Nakayama and as such the teachings of Nakayama remain an integral part of the evolution of the Shotokan style within the JSKA. Abe Sensei died on the 20th of December 2019.

Origins
Abe Keigo founded the Japan Shotokan Karate Association 10 February 1999 following his retirement as Technical Director of the JKA (Matsuno section) on 31 January 1999. As of 2008, Abe holds 9th Dan in the Japan Shotokan Karate Association and is the JSKA Chief Instructor. His current grade was awarded to him by his Shihankai at the World Championships held in Manchester, England. Abe Keigo, born in October 1938, had started Karate and Judo training when he was 15 years old, and it was in 1958 that he started to train at the Headquarters of the Japan Karate Association (JKA) thus becoming a student of Nakayama Masatoshi, who was to become his grand master. Abe trained there every day for nearly 35 years. In 1965 Abe graduated as JKA instructor and in 1985 was appointed Director of Qualifications. Whilst at the JKA, Keigo Abe saw a number of divisions arise from the 1970s onwards, such as in 1977, when JKA instructor Shiro Asano formed his own organization (which was to become Shotokan Karate-Do International Federation (SKIF)), taking with him Hirokazu Kanazawa to be chief instructor. Following Nakayama's death in 1987, the JKA experienced a turbulent period, both at the Tokyo headquarters and worldwide. Taiji Kase and Hiroshi Shirai, senior JKA instructors  in Europe quit to form the World Karate-Do Shotokan Academy. Taketo Okuda, JKA chief instructor in Brazil, quit to focus on his own organization, Butoku-kan. Abe became involved in a split in 1990, when a legal dispute started between two groups about the control of JKA. One group was led by Tetsuhiko Asai, the JKA chief instructor after Nakayama with Raizo Matsuno, the other by Nobuyuki Nakahara and including Masaaki Ueki and Masahiko Tanaka. Tetsuhiko Asai's group, known as the Matsuno section, included Keigo Abe and Mikio Yahara. In 1990, Abe was appointed Technical Director of the JKA (Matsuno section), a position held until retiring from the JKA (Matsuno section) on 31 January 1999. The Matsuno section itself disbanded when, after several court rulings, the issue of the rights to the JKA brand was ultimately settled by the Japanese Supreme Court on 10 June 1999, in favor of Nakahara's group.

Abe is quoted as saying "I feel however that Karate nowadays is centered only on winning competitions and that everybody trains towards this end. This is far from the truth. I believe that the true purpose of Karate lies in daily training with a goal to develop a strong mind and body and furthermore to contribute to society in general." Abe established the JSKA to realize what he himself saw as the true Karate purpose.

The JSKA claims members in over 40 countries globally while the organization's stated goals are to teach karate as a martial art based on the Japanese concepts of Budo and to gain perfection of technique and self-defense, while improving health, confidence and mental attitude.  It differentiates itself from other organizations by proclaiming a return to the traditional values and training of the Japan Karate Association as laid down by Masatoshi Nakayama, the JKA’s first Chief Instructor. Its students suggest that through the teachings of their Chief Instructor Keigo Abe, a direct student of Masotoshi Nakayama who in turn was taught by the founder of the style Gichin Funakoshi, that 'the Shotokan Legacy continues'.

The JSKA emphasizes the development of effective techniques utilising the low and long stances introduced by Yoshitaka Funakoshi and passed on through Nakayama to Abe, and although they are a general feature of the Shotokan style, the self-defense/budo element is continually stressed where the significance of natural actions, utilising good posture and biomechanics, ensures the execution of  a powerful and effective technique.   Although the JSKA does accept the need for tournaments, its use of the ippon shobu rules guarantees that the concept of ‘one strike, one kill’ is still maintained in their training

Grades
For all kyu gradings, the student must demonstrate to the examiners tier understanding of the three facets of the style; set patterns (kata), basics (kihon) and sparring (kumite). Grades are examined with the karateka presenting themselves for assessment, with the permission of their instructor, every three to four months. This situation last between 10th kyu and 1st kyu, depending on the affiliate association. The minimum waiting period between 1st kyu and 1st dan is typically a 6-12 month. Time between dan gradings increases approximately in yearly increments as the grade progresses. Kyu Grades run from 10th kyu to 1st Kyu and Dan grades from 1st Dan to10th Dan. Although kyu grades are coloured to show progression, all dan grades wear only  black belts. Dan gradings are taken under an authorized grading examiner. Senior grades above 5th Dan come specifically under the auspices of the JSKA Chief Instructor and are examined at national/international events (such as National/International Competitions). Depending on the grade being taken a similar format to the kyu grades is required covering all three sections of the training. The karateka must demonstrate a single kata of their choice while the chief examiner will choose another kata from a set list, depending on grade, to be performed. As the grades progress a research paper must be presented and the  bunkai (application)  of a kata chosen by the examiner, must be shown and explained.

Major Championships

World Cup/World Championship
The JSKA has since its inception ran a World Championships every 2 years:
2002 - Germany
2004 - South Africa
2006 - United States
2008 - United Kingdom
2010 - Portugal
2012 - Mexico
2014 - Italy
2016 - Namibia
2018 - Russia

JSKA Officials

JSKA Officials and Shihankai members

See also

References

External links
 JSKA Official web site
 keibukan 

JSKA Scotland www.jskascotland.com

Sports organizations established in 1999
1999 establishments in Japan
Karate
Karate organizations
Shotokan
Organizations based in Chiba Prefecture
Ichikawa, Chiba